Plus is the fifteenth full-length studio album by British electronic music duo Autechre. It was released digitally, without any prior announcement, on 28 October 2020, 12 days after the release of their prior album Sign. It was released on physical formats on 20 November 2020. The cover and packaging artwork was created by The Designers Republic to pair with the artwork of Sign. It is the second of two albums that Autechre had teased during a live mix session on streaming service Mixlr.

Critical reception

Like its companion album Sign, Plus has been met with critical acclaim. At Metacritic, which assigns a normalised rating out of 100 to reviews from professional publications, the album received an average score of 82, based on 5 reviews.

Track listing

Charts

References

External links
 
 

2020 albums
Autechre albums
Warp (record label) albums
Albums with cover art by The Designers Republic